Celebrate is the fourth Japanese studio album (seventh overall) by South Korean girl group Twice. It was released on July 27, 2022, by Warner Music Japan.

The album features nine tracks, including the title track, "Celebrate", and the previously released single "Doughnut". It also includes "Just Be Yourself", which was previously released as a digital single on March 22, 2022 and was used in Twice's advertisements for Lux Japan hair care products.

Release and promotion 
In May 2022, Twice announced that they would release an album titled Celebrate on July 27, to commemorate their fifth debut anniversary in Japan. The title track "Celebrate" was pre-released as a digital single on July 15, along with the accompanying music video.

To promote the album, Twice performed the eponymous title track on TV Asahi's Music Station, on July 22. The next day, the group performed "That's All I'm Saying" and "Celebrate" during a special live broadcast of NHK's music program Venue 101. Songs from the album were also performed during Twice Japan Fan Meeting 2022 "Once Day", held in Tokyo and Osaka for five days in October.

On December 28, Celebrate was released as a limited edition vinyl record. This is Twice's first album to be released in that format.

Commercial performance 
Following its release, the album debuted atop the Oricon daily album chart.

Track listing

Charts

Weekly charts

Monthly charts

Year-end charts

Certifications

Release history

References 

2022 albums
Twice (group) albums
Japanese-language albums
JYP Entertainment albums